Hitt's Mill and Houses, also known as Pry's Mill, Valley Mills, Hitt (or Cost) House, is a historic home and mill complex located at Keedysville, Washington County, Maryland, United States. It is a five-story stone and brick structure built as a grist mill. The ground story and the first full story above ground level are constructed of coursed limestone; the upper stories are built of brick.  Also on the property is a square log outbuilding with a hipped roof, a large frame bank barn, and part of a fieldstone barnyard fence.  The mill and the Hitt house served as hospitals during and after the nearby Civil War Battle of Antietam.

It was listed on the National Register of Historic Places in 1979.

References

External links
, including undated photo, at Maryland Historical Trust

Houses on the National Register of Historic Places in Maryland
Historic American Buildings Survey in Maryland
Houses completed in 1790
Houses in Washington County, Maryland
Grinding mills in Maryland
National Register of Historic Places in Washington County, Maryland
Grinding mills on the National Register of Historic Places in Maryland